The Cagayan Valley Lady Rising Suns were a professional women's volleyball team that played in various tournaments, including the Shakey's V-League and the Philippine Super Liga (PSL). The team was owned by the family of Alvaro Antonio (governor of the Province of Cagayan from 2007 to 2016) and managed by his daughter, Criselda Antonio (the incumbent mayor of Alcala, Cagayan and provincial sports coordinator for the Province of Cagayan), herself, a former volleyball player.

The team became inactive since July 2015 due to management issues within the team.

Team Colors
Main: Maroon 
2nd: White 
3rd: Yellow

Notable Records
 They are the first team in history to have an immaculate record of 16-0 (undefeated record) en route to the championship by winning the Shakey's V-League Season 10 Open Conference.

Honors

Team

Shakey's V-League

Philippine Super Liga

Others

Individual

Philippine Superliga

See also
 Cagayan Rising Suns (men's basketball team)
 Cagayan Valley Rising Suns (men's volleyball team)

References

External links 
 CVRS Club Page

Women's volleyball teams in the Philippines
Philippine Super Liga
C
2013 establishments in the Philippines
Volleyball clubs established in 2013
2015 disestablishments in the Philippines
Sports in Cagayan